Steve Russell, an enrolled member of the Cherokee Nation, was a poet, journalist and academic, as well as a former trial court judge and Associate Professor Emeritus of Criminal Justice, Indiana University Bloomington.

Early life and education
Despite being Cherokee, Russell was raised in the Muscogee Creek Nation in Oklahoma.

Cherokee politics
Russell was frequently critical of "wannabe" Indians - that is to say, people who claim falsely and without tribal recognition to have a Native American identity.  He was one of the earliest critics of Andrea Smith, calling her out in a 2008 editorial in the major American Indian new outlet, Indian Country Media Network.  He has also long documented corruption and bullying within Cherokee tribal politics.

The Native American Journalists Association twice recognized Russell's work, honoring his op-ed columns "Full-Blooded Indians—Face the Most Anti-Indian Racism" in 2013 and "Blacks and Indians Should Stand Together Against a Common Oppressor" in 2014 as the best Native op-eds in those years.

Academic writing
Russell's Sequoyah Rising: Problems in Post-Colonial Tribal Governance is probably his best-known work.  Described by the American Indian Quarterly as being concerned "with the bases of tribal citizenship," the book discusses the problems of Indian identity in the context of continuing US occupation and encroachment. Tom Holm wrote in Wíčazo Ša Review that "Russell's concise and insightful presentation of the course of American Indian policy is exceptional and should immediately be adopted by all who teach courses on Native American history and law," while the European Journal of American Studies noted that "Although clear that much of the blame for this must lie with a combination of federal government attempts to destroy Native control over Native affairs and a colonial culture of welfare dependency, nonetheless Russell argues that the power to self-organize means that many of the solutions lie in Indian hands."

Books

 World War ISIS: How to Kill a Death Cult and Avoid the End of Days (Dog Iron Press 2016).
 Ray Sixkiller’s Cherokee Nation: U.S. Election 2012 (Dog Iron Press 2014).
 American Indians Dream: A Movement of Our Own (Dog Iron Press 2014).
 Wicked Dew (Dog Iron Press 2012).
 Ceremonies of Innocence: Essays from the Indian Wars (Dog Iron Press 2012).
 Sequoyah Rising: Problems in Post-Colonial Tribal Governance (Carolina  Academic Press 2010).

Book Chapters:

 “Chains and Circles: Hierarchy and the Status of Animals,” (with Sara M. Walsh), in Issues in Animal Rights and Ethics 151-167 (M. Vyas, ed. 2011).
 “Indigenous Individual Rights: Theory, Praxis and 'Special Privileges',” in Tribal Rights—A Praxis 1-31 (R. Satyanarayana, ed., 2009).
 “Law and Bones and What the Meaning of ‘Is’ Is,” in Kennewick Man: Perspectives on the Ancient One 73-82 (Heather Burke, Claire Smith, Dorothy Lippert, Joe Watkins and Larry Zimmerman, eds., 2008).
 “Globalization of Criminal Justice in the Corporate Context”  (with Michael J. Gilbert), in Global Criminology and Criminal Justice: Current Issues and Perspectives 115-139 (Nick Larsen and Russell Smandych, eds., 2008).
 “The Cherokee Nation: A Colonial Morality Play in Three Acts,” in Eating Fire, Tasting Blood: Breaking the Great Silence of the American Indian Holocaust 128-145 (Marijo Moore, ed., 2006).
 “Levande Indianer” and “Döda Indianer” in De Kallar Oss Indianer 93-117 (Annika Banfield, ed., 2004).
 “Apples are the Color of Blood,” in Race and Ethnicity Across Time, Space and Discipline 19-30 (Rodney D. Coates, ed., 2004).
 “The Jurisprudence of Colonialism,” in American Indian Thought 217-228 (Anne Waters, ed., 2004).
 “Invisible Emblems: Empty Words and Sacred Honor,” in Genocide of the Mind 211-227 (Marijo Moore, ed., 2003).
 “The New Outlawry and Foucault’s Panoptic Nightmare,” in We Who Would Take No Prisoners 70-79 (Brian D. MacLean & Harold E. Pepinsky eds. 1993), reprinted in Before the Law: An Introduction to the Legal Process 266-270 (7th ed.  John J. Bonsignore, Ethan Katsh, Peter d’Errico, Ronald M. Pipkin, Stephen Arons and Janet Rifkin, eds. 2002).
 “Rent-a-Judge and Hide-a-Crime: The Dark Potential of Private Adjudication,” in Privatization of Criminal Justice: Past, Present and Future 113-122 (David Shichor & Michael J. Gilbert, eds. 2000).
 “Undercurrents of Judicial Policy: Demystifying the Third Branch of Government and the O.J. Simpson Case,” in Representing OJ: Murder, Criminal Justice & Mass Culture 178-182 (Gregg Barak, ed., 1996).
 “Native American Reburial Issues in State Courts,” Vol. 1, No. 11 in Indian Law Summaries (National Judicial College 1995). 
 “Trials Before the Municipal Court,” “Plea Bargaining in Municipal Court,” “Jury Trials in Municipal Court,” all in Travis County Practice Handbook (Austin Young Lawyers Association 1982).

Journal Articles

 “Sequoyah Rising: Doing What We Can With What We Have,” 18 Kansas Journal of Law and Public Policy 1-7 (2009).
 “Searching for ‘Some Accommodation:’ American Indian Religion in the Iron House,” 11 Contemporary Justice Review 213-227 (2008).
 “One-Sided Interest Convergence: Indian Sovereignty in Organizing and Litigation,” (with Terri Miles) 23 Wíčazo Ša Review 8-39 (2008).
 “Law and Bones: Religion, Science, and the Discourse of Empire,” 99 Radical History Review 214-226 (2007).
 “Chains and Circles: Hierarchy and the Status of Animals,” (with Sara M. Walsh) 3 Ayaangwaamizin: The International Journal of Indigenous Philosophy 271-290 (2006).
 “Sex, Lies and Law: Moral Turpitude as an Enforcer of Gender and Sexuality Norms,” (with Sara M. Walsh and Krista Eckhardt) 3 Sexuality Research and Social Policy 37-51 (2006).
 “Making Peace With Crow Dog’s Ghost: Racialized Prosecution in Federal Indian Law,” 21 Wíčazo Ša Review 89-114 (2006).
 “The Racial Paradox of Tribal Citizenship,” 46 American Studies 147-169 (2005).
 “From the Red Core to the Black Sky: Corporate Crime in the Transnational Matrix,” 12 Journal of Criminal Justice and Popular Culture 148-165 (2005).
 “Since September 11, All Roads Lead to Rome.”  13 Critical Criminology 37-53 (2005).
 “Sovereign Decisions: A Plan for Defeating Federal Review of Tribal Law Applications.”  20 Wíčazo Ša Review 93-108 (2005).
 “In Search of the Meritocracy.”  27 American Indian Quarterly 400-411 (2004).
 “Ethics, Alterity, Incommensurability, Honor.”  27 Cream City Review 121-144 (2003) and 3 Ayaangwaamizin: The International Journal of Indigenous Philosophy 31-54 (2003).
 “Teaching Criminal Justice Debate.”  (debate with Craig Hemmens, Mathieu Deflem, Vance McLaughlin, and Tom O’Connor) 26 ACJS Today (1): 13-14 (2003).
 “Honor, Lone Wolf, and Talking to the Wind.”  38 Tulsa Law Review 147-157 (2002).
 “Social Control of Transnational Corporations in the Age of Marketocracy.” (With Michael J. Gilbert) 30 International Journal of the Sociology of Law 33-50 (2002).
 “Globalization of Criminal Justice in the Corporate Context.”  (with Michael J. Gilbert)  38 Crime, Law and Social Change 211-238 (2002).
 “Apples are the Color of Blood.”  28 Critical Sociology 65-76 (2002).
 “The Jurisprudence of Colonialism.”  25 Legal Studies Forum 605-617 (2001).
 “The Two Faces in the U.S. Human Rights Mirror.”  (with Audrey Zamora and Christopher Boeck)  13 Peace Review 537-544 (2001).
 “Truman’s Revenge: Social Control and Corporate Crime.” (with Michael J. Gilbert) 32 Crime, Law and Social Change 59-82 (1999).
 “Critical Criminology at the Trial of Joseph K.: A Trial Judge’s Reflections on Asma’s Critique.”  Journal of Postmodern Criminology, Vol. 5, Art. 4 (1999).
 “A Black and White Issue: The Invisibility of American Indians in Racial Policy Discourse.”  4 Georgetown Public Policy Review 129-147 (1999).
 “Identity as Survival.”  11 Peace Review 299-301 (1999).
 “In the Ghetto: Legal Studies in Criminal Justice Programs,” 9 Journal of Criminal Justice Education 267-280 (1998).
 “American Indians in the Twilight of Affirmative Action.”  2 Chicago Policy Review 37-45 (1998).
 “Sacred Ground: Un-Marked Graves Protection in Texas Law,” 4 Texas Forum on Civil Liberties and Civil Rights 3-23 (1998).
 “The Invisible People,” Texas Spectrum, Vol. 6, No. 2 (1998).
 “Background on the Indian-Archaeologist Wars” (bibliography), Tennessee Archaeology (January 1998).
 “The Legacy of Thurgood Marshall in Strawberry Season,” 23 Thurgood Marshall Law Review 19-43 (1997).
 “Broken Windows: Prevention Strategy or Cracked Policy?” (roundtable discussion), The Critical Criminologist, Vol. 8, No. 1 at 7-10 (Fall 1997).
 “The Politics of Indian Identity,” 9 Peace Review 515-519 (1997).
 “Naming the Dragon: Law School Admissions in the Twilight of Affirmative Action,” Conference Proceedings, The Minority Student Today: Recruitment, Retention, and Success (University of South Carolina 1996).
 “Confessions of an Indecent Subversive,” Texas Lawyer, Vol. 12, No. 26 at 28 (Sept. 9, 1996).
 “A Time to Bury the Dead,” 8 Peace Review 245-247 (1996).
 “Indians and Anthropologists and the Politics of Identity,” epilogue to Quigg et al., Archeology and Native American Religion at the Leon River Medicine Wheel (Department of the Army 1996).
 “The Legacy of Ethnic Cleansing: Implementation of NAGPRA in Texas.”  19 American Indian Culture and Research Journal 193-211 (1995).
 "‘Sacred to All’: American Indians Seek Religious Freedom,” 58 Texas Bar Journal 362 (1995).
 “Political Correctness as a Plea for Rhetorical Disarmament,” 56 Texas Bar Journal 1144 (1993).
 “The Futility of Eloquence: Selected Texas Family Violence Legislation 1979-1991,” 33 South Texas Law Review 301-375 (1992), reprinted in 5 Texas Family Law Service 1-17 (1993).
 “The New Outlawry and Foucault's Panoptic Nightmare.”  17 American Journal of Criminal Justice 39-50 (1992).
 “Commentary on Representative Justice,” 16 Thurgood Marshall Law Review 57-74 (1990).
 “Status of the Texas Necessity Defense in Abortion Clinic Trespass Cases Assuming the Demise of Roe v. Wade,” 17 American Journal of Criminal Law 1-17 (1989).
 “Family Violence: What Lawyers and Judges Can Do,” 49 Texas Bar Journal 965-968 (1986).

Poetry and fiction
Russell's first book of poetry, Wicked Dew, won the First Book Award from the Native Writers' Circle of the Americas.

 “Honor Rap,” Pulse, (Heartsounds Press, May 4, 2004).
 “Indistinguishable Color,” Coloring Book: An Eclectic Anthology of Fiction and Poetry by Multicultural Writers 289-290 (boice-Terrel Allen, ed., 2003).
 “Disruption, 1997,” Hypatia: A Journal of Feminist Philosophy Vol. 18, No. 2 at 1-2 (2003).
 “What Indians Want,” Gatherings: The En'owkin Journal of First North American Peoples, Vol. 13, 81-82 (2002).
 “Donna’s Potsherds,” “How to Succeed as an Indian Poet,” and “Chitto Harjo,” Messenger Journal of Cherokee Literature, Vol. 1, No. 1 at 3-5 (2001).
 “Six O’Clock News,” in Hozho: Walking in Beauty 97-103 (Carolyn Dunn and Paula Gunn Allen, eds. 2001).
 “The Year They Drilled for Oil,” “Eleven Mile Hill,” and “Bison Bones,” South Dakota Review, Vol. 38, No. 1 at 15-21 (2000).
 “Repatriation,” Moccasin Telegraph, Vol. 6, No. 6 at 13 (1996).

Op-ed columnist 
The Daily Texan, 1972-1973.

The American Reporter, 1995-1999.

IMDiversity.com, 1999-2008.

Indian Country Today, 2008-2013.

Indian Country Media Network, 2013-2017.

Numerous other publications in the Austin American-Statesman, The Texas Observer, Newsweek, Philadelphia City Paper, Harper’s Magazine, and too many members of the Underground Press Syndicate to list.

See also 
 List of Native American jurists

References

External links
Author profile at Indian Country Today

Cherokee Nation writers
Living people
Native American academics
21st-century Native Americans
20th-century Native Americans
1947 births